The year 1854 in science and technology involved some significant events, listed below.

Astronomy
 July 22 – Discovery of the asteroid 30 Urania by John Russell Hind.
 October c. – George Airy calculates the mean density of the Earth by measuring the gravity in a coal mine in South Shields.

Chemistry
 Benjamin Silliman of Yale University is the first person to fractionate petroleum into its individual components by distillation.

Exploration
 January 4 – First definite sighting of McDonald Islands in the Antarctic.

Mathematics
 March 26 – Playfair cipher first demonstrated, by Charles Wheatstone.
 George Boole's work on algebraic logic, An Investigation of the Laws of Thought on Which are Founded the Mathematical Theories of Logic and Probabilities, published in London.
 Arthur Cayley states the original version of Cayley's theorem and produces the first Cayley table.
 Bernhard Riemann, a German mathematician, submits his habilitation thesis  ("About the representability of a function by a trigonometric series"), in which he describes the Riemann integral. It is published by Richard Dedekind in 1867.

Medicine
 April–May – Dr John Snow traces the source of one outbreak of cholera in London (which kills 500) to a single water pump, validating his theory that cholera is water-borne, and forming the starting point for epidemiology.
 November – Florence Nightingale and her team of trained volunteer nurses arrive at Selimiye Barracks in Scutari in the Ottoman Empire to care for British Army troops invalided from the Crimean War.
 Spanish-born vocal pedagogist Manuel García observes his own functioning glottis using a form of laryngoscope incorporating mirrors.
 Claude Bernard introduces the term Milieu intérieur in physiology.

Microbiology
 Filippo Pacini, an Italian anatomist, discovers Vibrio cholerae, the bacterium that causes cholera.
 Louis Pasteur begins studying fermentation at the request of brewers.

Technology

 May 9 – Albert Fink patents the Fink truss in the United States.
 May 17 – Deck of Wheeling Suspension Bridge in the United States destroyed through torsional movement and vertical undulations in a severe windstorm.
 July – First voyage by a seagoing steamship fitted with a compound steam engine, the screw steamer Brandon, built on the River Clyde in Scotland by John Elder.
 September 19 – Thaddeus Hyatt patents a practical pavement light.
 November 27 – André-Adolphe-Eugène Disdéri patents a method of producing carte de visite photographs in France.
 December 20 – In the case of Talbot v. Laroche, pioneer of photography Henry Fox Talbot fails in asserting that the collodion process infringes his calotype patent.
 James Ambrose Cutting takes out three United States patents for improvements to the wet plate collodion process (Ambrotype photography).
 Elisha Otis completes work on the safety elevator.

Events
 10 June – The Crystal Palace reopens in Sydenham, South London with life-size dinosaur models in the grounds.

Awards
 Copley Medal: Johannes Peter Müller
 Wollaston Medal for Geology: Richard John Griffith

Births
 January 27 – George Alexander Gibson (died 1913), Scottish physician and geologist.
 January 29 – Fred Baker (died 1938), American physician and naturalist.
 February 9 – Aletta Jacobs (died 1929), Dutch physician and women's suffrage activist
 March 4 – Napier Shaw (died 1945), English meteorologist.
 March 15 – Emil Adolf von Behring (died 1917), German physiologist, winner of the Nobel Prize in Physiology or Medicine in 1901.
 March 31 – Dugald Clerk (died 1932), Scottish mechanical engineer.
 April 28 – Phoebe Marks, later Hertha Ayrton (died 1923), English electrical engineer.
 April 29 – Henri Poincaré (died 1912),  French mathematician.
 May 11 – Ottmar Mergenthaler (died 1899), German-born inventor.
 June 13 – Charles Algernon Parsons (died 1931), British inventor of the steam turbine.
 July 12 – George Eastman (suicide 1932), American photographic inventor.
 July 23 – Birt Acres (died 1918), American-born cinematographic inventor.
 July 28 – Victor Babeș (died 1926), Austrian-born Romanian physician and bacteriologist.
 October 3 – Hermann Struve (died 1920), Russian-born astronomer.

Deaths
 April 15 – Arthur Aikin (born 1773), English chemist and mineralogist
 July 6 – Georg Ohm (born 1787), German physicist
 September 28 – George Field (born c.1777), English colour chemist
 November 18 – Edward Forbes (born 1815), Manx naturalist

References

 
19th century in science
1850s in science